The Korean War Memorial by artist Deborah Copenhaver Fellows is installed on the Washington State Capitol campus in Olympia, Washington, United States. Dedicated on July 24, 1993, the memorial features bronze figures.

See also
 List of Korean War memorials

References

1993 establishments in Washington (state)
1993 sculptures
Bronze sculptures in Washington (state)
Korean War memorials and cemeteries
Monuments and memorials in Olympia, Washington
Outdoor sculptures in Olympia, Washington
Sculptures of men in Washington (state)
Statues in Washington (state)
Washington State Capitol campus